Natalia Yurievna Mikhailova (born 18 July 1986) is a Russian former competitive ice dancer. With Arkadi Sergeev, she is the 2006 World Junior silver medalist.

Career 
Mikhailova competed with Arkadi Sergeev on the ISU Junior Grand Prix circuit for six seasons beginning in 2000. They won six gold medals and finished 4th three times at the JGP Final. Mikhailova and Sergeev won silver at the 2006 World Junior Championships. They changed coaches in September 2006, moving from Ksenia Rumiantseva and Petr Durnev to Alexander Zhulin. Mikhailova and Sergeev parted ways at the end of the 2006–07 season – Sergeev had sustained a number of injuries, including rupture of the outer ligaments of the ankle and a fracture, followed by a meniscus problem after he returned to the ice. 

Mikhailova and Andrei Maximishin teamed up in mid-2007 and were coached by Zhulin in Moscow. They competed together in the 2007–2008 season, winning the silver medal at the 2007 Golden Spin of Zagreb, but parted ways at the end of the season. 

Mikhailova and Sergeev teamed up again in 2008 but they retired from competition after finishing 6th at the 2009 Russian Championships.

Personal life 
Mikhailova married Alexander Zhulin in August 2018. Their daughter, Ekaterina, was born on 10 January 2013 in Moscow.

Programs 
(with Sergeev)

Competitive highlights 
GP: Grand Prix; JGP: Junior Grand Prix

With Sergeev

With Maximishin

References

External links 

 
 

Russian female ice dancers
Living people
Figure skaters from Moscow
1986 births
World Junior Figure Skating Championships medalists